Dhandwar is a village or Pind, which comes under Jalandhar district, Tehsil Phillaur, Punjab, India. It is near Dosanjh Kalan and Apra. Dhandwar is a very old village. The surname Dhandwar is 2 families made this village. As per the voter list of September 2018 around 1150 people are above 18 age live in the village. The village contains a collaboration of all religions and they all living together happily with maintained peace.
Dhandwar is also known as Dhandwara is well.

Sports 
A kabbadi mela (festival) is held every year in Dhandwar. It is one of the biggest kabbadi tournaments in Punjab, all international clubs play at Dhandwar. Every year-end of 24, 25 and 26 December. The tournament has been held at the Dhandwar school ground since 1957, village motive is to protect youth from drugs. Also, many adults and youth play cricket on the village ground and on the ground of bava nand gir ji.

Cricket, football, handball, volleyball, badminton, and Kabbadi are played in the village. There is a gym for youths.

This tournament is held every year in order to woo young people. This village is also suffering from use of Drugs by some youngsters.

Mela 
Every year, famous singers come to the function on ether on 27 or 28 Dec every year.
After the kabbadi tournament, a Mela is held on 27 December or sometimes 28 December, it is a huge Mela of Bava Nand Girji.
A huge number of people gather here every year in order to celebrate Mela, which was started before 1900.It almost 125 year mela happen in 2022. Many famous Punjabi singers perform here live every year to perform. Name Artist which already performed well such as Gurlej Akhtar, Gurnam Bhullar, Kulwinder Billa, Gippy Grewal, Harbhajan Mann, Manmohan Waris, Randhawa brothers,Amar Sehmbi, Gagan Kokri,Veet Baljit, Geeta Zaildar, Nisha Bano, K. S. Makhan, Kuldeep Manak, Yudvir Manak, Mohumad sadik, Rai jujar, Kuldeep Rasila, Shera jasbir, Botu shah and Kaka shah, Deep Dhillon & Jasmeen jassi,Sucha Rangeela & Mandeep Mandy, Sabar Koti, Satwinder Bitti, Satwinder Buga, Jelly Manjitpuri, Ranvir dusanj, Preet brar, and many more. In 2004, the Chief Minister of Punjab Parkash Singh Badal came to this village.

History 
Baba Nand Gir temple; In the 17th or 18th century a baba (holy saint) lived in the village and when the rain failed to come the baba prayed to God for rain and did not eat anything for a month. When the rain came the baba was dead; the temple was made for his honor.

There are two gurdwaras, one of this is Sikh temple and other one is Guru Ravidass gurudwara. There are also one temple, and two masjids (mosques) in the village.

Currently, there is a panchayat system running as according to Indian law.

Surname 
Dhandwar surname is in the village but later they changed it to Madahar.
Now Dhandwar and Madahar are the same surnames, so some people write Dhandwar and some write Madahar.
Dhandwar surname people also live in Cheema, like Garhi maha Singh, a singer you know well. Geeta Zaildar is also from a surname, Dhandwar.

People with this surname belong to the Jat clan. Over thousands of people have this last name in Punjab. This caste originated in Jalandhar.

Education 

There is a primary school as well as a secondary school in the village alongside a playground. There is another school called Akal Academy on the outskirts of the village, which actually in the land of next the village Chak Desraj.

References

  Harpreet Singh, H. S. (2014). Dhandwar History.  Dhandwar Press. p. 1 to 60

External links 
Official Facebook page

Villages in Jalandhar district